Alkali salts or basic salts are salts that are the product of incomplete   neutralization of a strong base and a weak acid.

Rather than being neutral (as some other salts), alkali salts are bases as their name suggests. What makes these compounds basic is that the conjugate base from the weak acid hydrolyzes to form a basic solution. In sodium carbonate, for example, the carbonate from the carbonic acid hydrolyzes to form a basic solution. The chloride from the hydrochloric acid in sodium chloride does not hydrolyze, though, so sodium chloride is not basic.

The difference between a basic salt and an alkali is that an alkali is the soluble hydroxide compound of an alkali metal or an alkaline earth metal. A basic salt is any salt that hydrolyzes to form a basic solution. 

Another definition of a basic salt would be a salt that contains amounts of both hydroxide and other anions. White lead is an example. It is basic lead carbonate, or lead carbonate hydroxide. 

These materials are known for their high levels of dissolution in polar solvents.

These salts are insoluble and are obtained through precipitation reactions.

Examples
Sodium carbonate
Sodium acetate
Potassium cyanide
Sodium sulfide
Sodium bicarbonate
Sodium hydroxide

Alkaline salts
'Alkaline salts' are often the major component of alkaline dishwasher detergent powders.

These salts may include:
alkali metasilicates
alkali metal hydroxides
Sodium carbonate
Sodium Bicarbonate

Examples of other strongly alkaline salts, include:
Sodium percarbonate
Sodium persilicate (?)
Potassium metabisulfite

See also
Alkali
Acid salt

References

Salts